John F. Alksne is a Professor Emeritus of Neurosurgery and former Dean of the School of Medicine at the University of California, San Diego.

Early life 
John F. Alksne was born in San Jose, California in 1933. He graduated from Palo Alto High School in 1951.

Career 
Alksne obtained his medical degree at the University of Washington in Seattle.

After spending one year at the Anatomical Institute in Oslo, Norway, Alksne served as the Chief of Neurosurgery at Harbor General Hospital at UCLA from 1964 to 1967. He then served as the Professor and Chair of Neurological Surgery at the Medical College of Virginia from 1967 to 1971.

Alksne moved to San Diego in 1971. At the University of California, San Diego, Alksne would serve as:
 Professor of Surgery, Division of Neurological Surgery, UCSD School of Medicine
 Founding Chief, Division of Neurological Surgery, UCSD School of Medicine
 Vice Chancellor for Health Sciences, UCSD School of Medicine
 Dean, UCSD School of Medicine
As the Dean of the School of Medicine and the Vice Chancellor of Health Sciences, Alksne oversaw both the School of Medicine and the university's two hospitals. Alksne also founded the Epilepsy Surgery Program at UCSD and would later receive an award from the Epilepsy Society of San Diego.

In 1993, Alksne performed the first surgery at the then-new John M. and Sally B. Thornton Hospital and Perlman Ambulatory Care Center at UCSD.

He was appointed Dean of the UCSD School of Medicine in 1992, was appointed Vice Chancellor for Health Sciences in 1994, and served as Chief of Neurological Surgery at UCSD until 1995.

Professional organizations 
 American Association of Neurological Surgeons
 The Latin American Federal of Neurosurgeons
 The World Society of Stereotactic and Functional Neurosurgery
 The Association of American Medical Colleges
 The Association of Academic Health Centers
Alksne was the Program Chairman for The Society of Neurological Surgeons meeting in Rochester, Minnesota and hosted the society's 1993 meeting in San Diego.

Personal life 
Alksne is active in the San Diego cultural and philanthropic community, and was a key figure in the creation of the John M. and Sally B. Thornton Hospital and Perlman Ambulatory Care Center.

References 

American neurosurgeons
Living people
People from San Jose, California
University of California, San Diego faculty
University of Washington School of Medicine alumni
1933 births